Pike Place Bakery is a bakery at Seattle's Pike Place Market, in the U.S. state of Washington.

Description 
Located in the Main Arcade, the woman-owned business sells cakes, cinnamon rolls, cookies, croissants, doughnuts, and fritters, among other pastries. The business has been described as the market's "original bakery".

History 
Cora Mares purchased and began operating Pike Place Bakery in 1983. Seattle Weekly has said the business "keeps a low profile".

Reception 
In 2018, Harrison Jacobs of Business Insider wrote, "The Pike Place Bakery makes some incredible pastries, including local favorites like the maple bar. They've also got some crazy deals if you don't mind eating day-old pastries."

See also 

 List of bakeries

References

External links 

 Pike Place Bakery at Pike Place Market
 Pike Place Bakery at Zomato

Central Waterfront, Seattle
Pike Place Market
Restaurants in Seattle